Neuss is a Kreis (district) in the west of North Rhine-Westphalia, Germany. Nearby are the urban districts Mönchengladbach, Krefeld, Duisburg, Düsseldorf, Cologne, the districts Rhein-Erft-Kreis, Düren, Heinsberg and the district Viersen.

History

In 1816 the districts Grevenbroich and Neuss were created when the whole area became part of Prussia. The city Neuss left the district in 1913 to become an urban district. In 1975 the urban district of Neuss lost its independent status and was merged into the Grevenbroich district, which was renamed to Kreis Neuss to represent the new administrative seat. On May 26, 2003, it changed its name, and is now officially called Rhein-Kreis Neuss.

Geography

The main rivers of the district is the Rhine which forms most of the north-eastern border of the district, as well as the Erft. In the southern part of the district are big open pit Lignite (brown coal) mines.

Coat of arms
The coat of arms was continued from the district Grevenbroich. The lion in the right side comes from the city of Jülich. The black cross in the left comes from the Cologne coat of arms. Both the bishops of Cologne as well as the dukes of Jülich owned land of the Neuss district.

Towns and municipalities

References

External links

Official website (German)

 
Neuss